David Boris Philippe Henen (born 19 April 1996) is a professional footballer who plays as a winger and striker for Belgian club Kortrijk. Born in Belgium, Henen represents the Togo national football team.

Early and personal life
Henen was born in Libramont-Chevigny on 19 April 1996.

Club career
Henen played youth football with Virton, Standard Liège and Anderlecht, before moving on loan to French club Monaco II on loan in September 2013.

In July 2014 he was linked with a transfer to English club Everton.

On 1 September 2014, he signed for Greek club Olympiacos, simultaneously moving on loan to Everton for the duration of the 2014–15 season. The transfer was made permanent in July 2015, for a fee of around £200,000.

Henen joined League One club Fleetwood Town on a season long loan on 11 November 2015.

He was released by Everton at the end of the 2017–18 season.

On 31 August 2018, Henen joined Belgian side Charleroi. He signed a contract running to 2020.

In October 2020 he signed for French club Grenoble.

On 31 January 2022, Henen signed a two-and-a-half-year contract with Kortrijk back in Belgium.

International career
Henen was born in Belgium to a Belgian father and a Togolese mother, and is eligible for both national teams. He has represented Belgium at youth international level.

Henen represented the Togo national football team in a 1–0 2021 Africa Cup of Nations qualification loss to Comoros on 14 November 2019.

Style of play
Henen has been described as a "pacy and gifted forward."

Career statistics

References

External links
 

1996 births
Living people
People from Libramont-Chevigny
Citizens of Togo through descent
Togolese footballers
Togo international footballers
Belgian footballers
Belgium youth international footballers
Black Belgian sportspeople
Togolese people of Belgian descent
Belgian people of Togolese descent
Belgian sportspeople of African descent
R.E. Virton players
Standard Liège players
R.S.C. Anderlecht players
AS Monaco FC players
Olympiacos F.C. players
Everton F.C. players
Fleetwood Town F.C. players
R. Charleroi S.C. players
Grenoble Foot 38 players
K.V. Kortrijk players
English Football League players
Belgian Pro League players
Ligue 2 players
Association football wingers
Association football forwards
Togolese expatriate footballers
Belgian expatriate footballers
Expatriate footballers in France
Belgian expatriate sportspeople in France
Expatriate footballers in Greece
Belgian expatriate sportspeople in Greece
Expatriate footballers in England
Belgian expatriate sportspeople in England
Footballers from Luxembourg (Belgium)